Llanfor is a village in Gwynedd, Wales near the town of Bala, in the community of Llandderfel.

History
There is evidence of an Iron Age Hill Fort in the immediate area and Roman Castrum.

In the 6th century an unknown Monk from Llanfor was reputedly responsible for converting Llywarch Hen, prince of Rheged, to Christianity. It was also the site of a church built by Saint Tyneio, the 6th century Patron Saint of the town.

There is a legend that the Devil used to frequently visit Llanfor Church in the shape of a pig.

Notable People from Llanfor

 Saint Tyneio a 6th C. pre-congregational Saint of Wales.
 William Price (1619–1691), a Welsh politician, MP between 1640 and 1679 and fought as a Royalist colonel in the English Civil War.
 Humphrey Foulkes (1673–1737) a Welsh priest and antiquarian.
 William Price (1690–1774) a Welsh High Sheriff and antiquarian, from Rhiwlas.
 Richard Thelwall Price, British Member of Parliament for Beaumaris, 1754–1768
 John Williams (1811–1862), antiquary, bardic name Ab Ithel, the Anglican curate of Llanfor from 1835
 Richard Williams Morgan (1815–1889), bardic name Môr Meirion, author, priest and Welsh nationalist campaigner
 David Roberts (1831–1884), poet known as ‘Dewi Havhesp’, spent his early years at 'Pensingrug', Llanfor.

References

Villages in Gwynedd